Ralph Arthur Warburton (January 7, 1924 − December 25, 2021) was an American ice hockey right wing, and was a member of the United States national team at the 1948 Winter Olympics.

Playing career

College career
Warburton played right wing for Dartmouth College, he became part of a powerhouse line for Dartmouth with eventual Olympic teammates, Bruce Mather at center and Bruce Cunliffe on left wing. This line not only led Dartmouth in scoring for two seasons, but helped Dartmouth achieve a remarkable 46-game unbeaten streak (45-0-1) from 1941–42 to 1944–45. Warburton set a career high for points in a single game on January 20, 1945, as he registered 7 points against Cornell University, with five goals and two assists. For the 1946–47 season Warburton was named co-captain of the team. During this season he added two more four-goal performances against Army and Boston College. The two high scoring games came in close succession, with the first occurring on February 8, 1946, and the second coming just three days later on February 11, 1946. Dartmouth ended the 1946–47 season as the number one ranked team in the nation. The number one ranking was more significant at the time, since it was prior to the advent of NCAA hockey championships.

1948 Olympics
In 1948, Warburton headed to St. Moritz, Switzerland to take part in the Olympic Games with his fellow line mates. Unfortunately due to a conflict over what truly constituted an amateur athlete, two United States teams were sent. It was a situation that nearly caused the cancellation of the entire ice hockey tournament at the 1948 Olympics. Eventually a compromise was made and Warburton's squad was allowed to compete, but were ineligible for medal contention.

Later career
He continued to play hockey after the Olympics first with the Milwaukee Clarks and later was reunited with Bruce Mather on the Boston Olympics. Warburton's best post-college year came during the 1950–51 season while playing for the Olympics in the Eastern Hockey League. In that year Warburton finished in the top ten in all three major offensive statistical categories. He ranked second in goals (33), tenth in assists (30), and sixth in points (63).

Personal life and death
Warburton was born in Cranston, Rhode Island, on January 7, 1924. He died on December 25, 2021, at the age of 97. At age 94, he was honored by the Rhode Island Hockey Hall of Fame in 2018 with the Malcolm Greene Chace Award for "Lifetime contributions of a Rhode Islander to the game of ice hockey". He was inducted as an honored member of the Rhode Island Hockey Hall of Fame in 2022.

Career statistics

References

External links

1924 births
2021 deaths
American men's ice hockey right wingers
Boston Olympics players
Dartmouth Big Green men's ice hockey players
Ice hockey players from Rhode Island
Ice hockey players at the 1948 Winter Olympics
Olympic ice hockey players of the United States
Sportspeople from Cranston, Rhode Island